Andradea is a genus of flowering plants belonging to the family Nyctaginaceae.

Its native range is Eastern Brazil.

Species:

Andradea floribunda

References

Nyctaginaceae
Caryophyllales genera